Celine Lesage (born 1971) is a French woman found guilty in 2010 of murdering six of her newborn babies between 2000 and 2007. She suffocated four of them, and strangled two. On October 19, 2007, a new boyfriend, Luc Margueritte, found the six corpses in the basement of the apartment he and Lesage were sharing. She was sentenced to 15 years in prison for the murders.

See also
 Infanticide
 Véronique Courjault
 Dominique Cottrez
 List of French serial killers

References

1971 births
Filicides
French female serial killers
French people convicted of murder
Living people
People convicted of murder by France